La Trompette may refer to:
 La Trompette (musical society), a chamber music society that was based in Paris
 La Trompette (restaurant), a Michelin-starred restaurant